The Eternal Return (French: L'Éternel retour)  is a 1943 French romantic drama film directed by Jean Delannoy and starring Madeleine Sologne and Jean Marais. The screenplay was written by Jean Cocteau as a retelling of Tristan and Isolde set in contemporary France. In the United Kingdom, the film was released in 1946 by Eagle-Lion Distributors under the alternative title Love Eternal.

It was made at the Victorine Studios in Nice with sets designed by the art director Georges Wakhévitch. The film's costumes were by Georges Annenkov. Location shooting took place at the Chateau de Pesteils in Polminhac. It premiered in Vichy and was one of the greatest commercial hits of the occupation period.

Cast 
 Madeleine Sologne as Nathalie, the blonde
 Jean Marais as Patrice
 Jean Murat as Marc
 Junie Astor as Nathalie, the brunette
 Roland Toutain as Lionel
 Jane Marken as Anne 
 Jean d'Yd as Amédée Frossin
 Piéral as Achille Frossin
 Yvonne de Bray as  Gertrude Frossin
 Alexandre Rignault as Morholt

References

Bibliography
 Lanzoni, Rémi Fournier . French Cinema: From Its Beginnings to the Present. A&C Black, 2004.

External links 
 
 L'Éternel retour (1943) at the Films de France

1943 films
French romantic drama films
1940s French-language films
French black-and-white films
Films directed by Jean Delannoy
1943 romantic drama films
Films scored by Georges Auric
Films with screenplays by Jean Cocteau
Films shot at Victorine Studios
Eagle-Lion Films films
1940s French films